Ludovigo Galbiati or Ludovicus Galbiati (1577 – 23 May 1638) was a Roman Catholic prelate who served as Bishop of Acerno (1637–1638).

Biography
Ludovicus Galbiati was born in Rome, Italy in 1577. On 17 August 1637, he was appointed during the papacy of Pope Urban VIII as Bishop of Acerno. On 6 September 1637, he was consecrated bishop by Alessandro Cesarini (iuniore), Cardinal-Deacon of Santa Maria in Cosmedin, with Alfonso Gonzaga, Titular Archbishop of Rhodus, and Giovanni Battista Scanaroli, Titular Bishop of Sidon, serving as co-consecrators. He served as Bishop of Acerno until his death on 23 May 1638.

References

External links and additional sources
 (for Chronology of Bishops) 
 (for Chronology of Bishops) 

17th-century Italian Roman Catholic bishops
Bishops appointed by Pope Urban VIII
1577 births
1638 deaths